Rhytidognathus is a genus of ground beetles in the family Carabidae. There are two described species in Rhytidognathus.

Species
These two species belong to the genus Rhytidognathus:
 Rhytidognathus ovalis (Dejean, 1831)  (Uruguay)
 Rhytidognathus platensis Roig-Juñent & Rouaux, 2012  (Argentina)

References

Migadopinae